Khaki Jabbar District (Persian: ولسوالی خاک جبار) is a mountainous district situated in the southeastern part of Kabul Province, Afghanistan. The district headquarters is Khak-i Jabbar village, which is located in the central part of the district.

Demographics
Like in the rest of Afghanistan, no exact population numbers are available. The Afghan Ministry of Rural Rehabilitation & Development (MRRD) along with UNHCR estimates the population of the district to be around 7,461. According to AIMS and UNHCR, the overwhelmingly majority of the population are Pashtuns (at 80%), while the remaining 20% are ethnic Tajiks.

Geography
Khaki Jabbar district borders Logar Province and Mussahi District to the west, Bagrami and Surobi districts to the north, and Nangarhar Province to the east.

Among the major villages in the district are Chakari, Malang, Khurd Kabul, Karo Khail and Kharotti village.

References

External links 
AIMS District Map

Districts of Kabul Province